For centuries, there have been movements to reform the spelling of the English language. It seeks to change English orthography so that it is more consistent, matches pronunciation better, and follows the alphabetic principle. Common motives for spelling reform include quicker learning, cheaper learning, and making English more useful as an international auxiliary language.

Reform proposals vary in terms of the depth of the linguistic changes and by their implementations. In terms of writing systems, most spelling reform proposals are moderate; they use the traditional English alphabet, try to maintain the familiar shapes of words, and try to maintain common conventions (such as silent e).  More radical proposals involve adding or removing letters or symbols, or even creating new alphabets.  Some reformers prefer a gradual change implemented in stages, while others favor an immediate and total reform for all.

Some spelling reform proposals have been adopted partially or temporarily. Many of the spellings preferred by Noah Webster have become standard in the United States, but have not been adopted elsewhere (see American and British English spelling differences). Harry Lindgren's proposal, SR1, was once popular in Australia.

History
Modern English spelling developed from about 1350 onwards, when—after three centuries of Norman French rule—English gradually became the official language of England again, although very different from before 1066, having incorporated many words of French origin (battle, beef, button, etc.). Early writers of this new English, such as Geoffrey Chaucer, gave it a fairly consistent spelling system, but this was soon diluted by Chancery clerks who re-spelled words based on French orthography. English spelling consistency was dealt a further blow when William Caxton brought the printing press to London in 1476. Having lived in mainland Europe for the preceding 30 years, his grasp of the English spelling system had become uncertain. The Belgian assistants whom he brought to help him set up his business had an even poorer command of it.

As printing developed, printers began to develop individual preferences or "house styles". Furthermore, typesetters were paid by the line and were fond of making words longer. However, the biggest change in English spelling consistency occurred between 1525, when William Tyndale first translated the New Testament, and 1539, when King Henry VIII legalized the printing of English Bibles in England. The many editions of these Bibles were all printed outside England by people who spoke little or no English. They often changed spellings to match their Dutch orthography. Examples include the silent h in ghost (to match Dutch , which later became ), aghast, ghastly and gherkin.

There have been two periods when spelling reform of the English language has attracted particular interest.

16th and 17th centuries
The first of these periods was from the middle of the 16th to the middle of the 17th centuries AD, when a number of publications outlining proposals for reform were published. Some of these proposals were:
  (On the Rectified and Amended Written English Language) in 1568 by Sir Thomas Smith, Secretary of State to Edward VI and Elizabeth I.
  in 1569 by John Hart, Chester Herald.
  in 1580 by William Bullokar.
  in 1621 by Dr. Alexander Gill, headmaster of St Paul's School in London.
  in 1634 by Charles Butler, vicar of Wootton St Lawrence.

These proposals generally did not attract serious consideration because they were too radical or were based on an insufficient understanding of the phonology of English. However, more conservative proposals were more successful. Many of these spellings are now in general use.

From the 16th century AD onward, English writers who were scholars of Greek and Latin literature tried to link English words to their Graeco-Latin counterparts. They did this by adding silent letters to make the real or imagined links more obvious. Thus  became debt (to link it to Latin ),  became doubt (to link it to Latin ),  became scissors and  became scythe (as they were wrongly thought to come from Latin ),  became island (as it was wrongly thought to come from Latin ),  and so forth.

William Shakespeare satirized the disparity between English spelling and pronunciation. In his play Love's Labour's Lost, the character Holofernes is "a pedant" who insists that pronunciation should change to match spelling, rather than simply changing spelling to match pronunciation. For example, Holofernes insists that everyone should pronounce the unhistorical B in words like doubt and debt.

19th century

The second period started in the 19th century and appears to coincide with the development of phonetics as a science. In 1806, Noah Webster published his first dictionary, A Compendious Dictionary of the English Language. It included an essay on the oddities of modern orthography and his proposals for reform. Many of the spellings he used, such as color and center, would become hallmarks of American English. In 1807, Webster began compiling an expanded dictionary. It was published in 1828 as An American Dictionary of the English Language. Although it drew some protest, the reformed spellings were gradually adopted throughout the United States.

In 1837, Isaac Pitman published his system of phonetic shorthand, while in 1848 Alexander John Ellis published A Plea for Phonetic Spelling. These were proposals for a new phonetic alphabet. Although unsuccessful, they drew widespread interest.

By the 1870s, the philological societies of Great Britain and America chose to consider the matter. After the "International Convention for the Amendment of English Orthography" that was held in Philadelphia in August 1876, societies were founded such as the English Spelling Reform Association and American Spelling Reform Association. That year, the American Philological Society adopted a list of eleven reformed spellings for immediate use. These were are→ar, give→giv, have→hav, live→liv, though→tho, through→thru, guard→gard, catalogue→catalog, (in)definite→(in)definit, wished→wisht. One major American newspaper that began using reformed spellings was the Chicago Tribune, whose editor and owner, Joseph Medill, sat on the Council of the Spelling Reform Association. In 1883, the American Philological Society and American Philological Association worked together to produce 24 spelling reform rules, which were published that year. In 1898, the American National Education Association adopted its own list of 12 words to be used in all writings: tho, altho, thoro, thorofare, thru, thruout, catalog, decalog, demagog, pedagog, prolog, program.

20th century onward

The Simplified Spelling Board was founded in the United States in 1906. The SSB's original 30 members consisted of authors, professors and dictionary editors. Andrew Carnegie, a founding member, supported the SSB with yearly bequests of more than US$300,000. In April 1906, it published a list of 300 words, which included 157 spellings that were already in common use in American English. In August 1906, the SSB word list was adopted by Theodore Roosevelt, who ordered the Government Printing Office to start using them immediately. However, in December 1906, the U.S. Congress passed a resolution and the old spellings were reintroduced. Nevertheless, some of the spellings survived and are commonly used in American English today, such as anaemia/anæmia→anemia and mould→mold. Others such as mixed→mixt and scythe→sithe did not survive. In 1920, the SSB published its Handbook of Simplified Spelling, which set forth over 25 spelling reform rules. The handbook noted that every reformed spelling now in general use was originally the overt act of a lone writer, who was followed at first by a small minority. Thus, it encouraged people to "point the way" and "set the example" by using the reformed spellings whenever they could. However, with its main source of funds cut off, the SSB disbanded later that year.

In Britain, spelling reform was promoted from 1908 by the Simplified Spelling Society and attracted a number of prominent supporters. One of these was George Bernard Shaw (author of Pygmalion) and much of his considerable will was left to the cause. Among members of the society, the conditions of his will gave rise to major disagreements, which hindered the development of a single new system.

Between 1934 and 1975, the Chicago Tribune, then Chicago's biggest newspaper, used a number of reformed spellings. Over a two-month spell in 1934, it introduced 80 respelled words, including tho, thru, thoro, agast, burocrat, frate, harth, herse, iland, rime, staf and telegraf. A March 1934 editorial reported that two-thirds of readers preferred the reformed spellings. Another claimed that "prejudice and competition" was preventing dictionary makers from listing such spellings. Over the next 40 years, however, the newspaper gradually phased out the respelled words. Until the 1950s, Funk & Wagnalls dictionaries listed many reformed spellings, including the SSB's 300, alongside the conventional spellings.

In 1949, a Labour MP, Dr Mont Follick, introduced a private member's bill in the House of Commons, which failed at the second reading. In 1953, he again had the opportunity, and this time it passed the second reading by 65 votes to 53. Because of anticipated opposition from the House of Lords, the bill was withdrawn after assurances from the Minister of Education that research would be undertaken into improving spelling education. In 1961, this led to James Pitman's Initial Teaching Alphabet, introduced into many British schools in an attempt to improve child literacy. Although it succeeded in its own terms, the advantages were lost when children transferred to conventional spelling. After several decades, the experiment was discontinued.

In his 1969 book Spelling Reform: A New Approach, the Australian linguist Harry Lindgren proposed a step-by-step reform. The first, Spelling Reform step 1 (SR1), called for the short  sound (as in bet) to always be spelled with <e> (for example friend→frend, head→hed). This reform had some popularity in Australia.

In 2013, University of Oxford Professor of English Simon Horobin proposed that variety in spelling be acceptable. For example, he believes that it does not matter whether words such as "accommodate" and "tomorrow" are spelled with double letters. This proposal does not fit within the definition of spelling reform used by, for example, Random House Dictionary.

Arguments for reform 
It is argued that spelling reform would make it easier to learn to read (decode), to spell, and to pronounce, making it more useful for international communication, reducing educational budgets (reducing literacy teachers, remediation costs, and literacy programs) and/or enabling teachers and learners to spend more time on more important subjects or expanding subjects.

Another argument is the sheer amount of resources that are wasted using the current spelling. For example, Cut Spelling can reduce spelling up to 15%. According to that figure, for every 100 letters being used on a daily basis there are 15 letters being used unnecessarily. That amounts to 15 pages for every 100 pages of a book, or about 1 in 7 trees. This applies to all aspects of daily living including shopping receipts, office documents, newspapers and magazines, and internet traffic. This is taxing on time, energy, money, and other resources.

Advocates note that spelling reforms have taken place already, just slowly and often not in an organized way. There are many words that were once spelled un-phonetically but have since been reformed. For example, music was spelled musick until the 1880s, and fantasy was spelled phantasy until the 1920s. For a time, almost all words with the -or ending (such as error) were once spelled -our (errour), and almost all words with the -er ending (such as member) were once spelled -re (membre). In American spelling, most of them now use -or and -er, but in British spelling, only some have been reformed.

In the last 250 years, since Samuel Johnson prescribed how words ought to be spelled, pronunciations of hundreds of thousands of words (as extrapolated from Masha Bell's research on 7000 common words) have gradually changed, and the alphabetic principle in English has gradually been corrupted. Advocates argue that if we wish to keep English spelling regular, then spelling needs to be amended to account for the changes.

Reduced spelling is currently practiced on informal internet platforms and is common in text messaging.

The way vowel letters are used in English spelling vastly contradicts their usual meanings. For example, ⟨o⟩, expected to represent [əʊ] or [oʊ], may stand for [ʌ], while ⟨u⟩, expected to represent [ʌ], may represent [juː]. This makes English spelling even less intuitive for foreign learners than it is for native speakers, which is of importance for an international auxiliary language.

Ambiguity 
Unlike many other languages, English spelling has never been systematically updated and thus today only partly holds to the alphabetic principle. As an outcome, English spelling is a system of weak rules with many exceptions and ambiguities.

Most phonemes in English can be spelled in more than one way. E.g. the words fr and pr contain the same sound in different spellings. Likewise, many graphemes in English have multiple pronunciations and decodings, such as ough in words like thr, th, tht, thor, t, tr, and pl. There are 13 ways of spelling the schwa (the most common of all phonemes in English), 12 ways to spell  and 11 ways to spell . These kinds of incoherences can be found throughout the English lexicon and they even vary between dialects. Masha Bell has analyzed 7000 common words and found that about 1/2 cause spelling and pronunciation difficulties and about 1/3 cause decoding difficulties.

Such ambiguity is particularly problematic in the case of heteronyms (homographs with different pronunciations that vary with meaning), such as bow, desert, live, read, tear, wind, and wound. In reading such words one must consider the context in which they are used, and this increases the difficulty of learning to read and pronounce English.

A closer relationship between phonemes and spellings would eliminate many exceptions and ambiguities, making the language easier and faster to master.

Undoing the changes

Some proposed simplified spellings already exist as standard or variant spellings in old literature. As noted earlier, in the 16th century, some scholars of Greek and Latin literature tried to make English words look more like their Graeco-Latin counterparts, at times even erroneously. They did this by adding silent letters, so det became debt, dout became doubt, sithe became scythe, iland became island, ake became ache, and so on. Some spelling reformers propose undoing these changes. Other examples of older spellings that are more phonetic include frend for friend (as on Shakespeare's grave), agenst for against, yeeld for yield, bild for build, cort for court, sted for stead, delite for delight, entise for entice, gost for ghost, harth for hearth, rime for rhyme, sum for some, tung for tongue, and many others. It was also once common to use -t for the ending -ed where it is pronounced as such (for example dropt for dropped). Some of the English language's most celebrated writers and poets have used these spellings and others proposed by today's spelling reformers. Edmund Spenser, for example, used spellings such as rize, wize and advize in his famous poem The Faerie Queene, published in the 1590s.

Redundant letters
The English alphabet has several letters whose characteristic sounds are already represented elsewhere in the alphabet. These include X, which can be realised as "ks", "gz", or z; soft G, which can be realised as J; hard C, which can be realised as K; soft C, which can be realised as S; and Q ("qu",  or ), which can be realised as "kw" (or simply K in some cases). However, these spellings are usually retained to reflect their often-Latin roots.

Arguments against reform

Spelling reform faces many arguments against the development and implementation of a reformed orthography for English. Public acceptance to spelling reform has been consistently low, at least since the early 19th century, when spelling was codified by the influential English dictionaries of Samuel Johnson (1755) and Noah Webster (1806). The irregular spelling of very common words, such as are, have, done, of, would makes it difficult to fix them without introducing a noticeable change to the appearance of English text.

English is the only one of the top ten major languages with no associated worldwide regulatory body with the power to promulgate spelling changes.

English is a West Germanic language that has borrowed many words from non-Germanic languages, and the spelling of a word often reflects its origin. This sometimes gives a clue as to the meaning of the word. Even if their pronunciation has strayed from the original pronunciation, the spelling is a record of the phoneme. The same is true for words of Germanic origin whose current spelling still resembles their cognates in other Germanic languages. Examples include light, German ; knight, German ; ocean, French ; occasion, French . Critics argue that re-spelling such words could hide those links, although not all spelling reforms necessarily require significantly re-spelling them.

Another criticism is that a reform may favor one dialect or pronunciation over others, creating a standard language. Some words have more than one acceptable pronunciation, regardless of dialect (e.g. economic, either). Some distinctions in regional accents are still marked in spelling. Examples include the distinguishing of fern, fir and fur that is maintained in Irish and Scottish English or the distinction between toe and tow that is maintained in a few regional dialects in England and Wales. However, dialectal accents exist even in languages whose spelling is called phonemic, such as Spanish.

Some words are distinguished only by non-phonetic spelling (as in knight and night).

Spelling reform proposals

Most spelling reforms attempt to improve phonemic representation, but some attempt genuine phonetic spelling, usually by changing the basic English alphabet or making a new one. All spelling reforms aim for greater regularity in spelling.

Using the basic English alphabet

Cut Spelling
Handbook of Simplified Spelling
SoundSpel
Spelling Reform 1 (SR1)
Traditional Spelling Revised
Wijk's Regularized Inglish

Extending or replacing the basic English alphabet 

These proposals seek to eliminate the extensive use of digraphs (such as "ch", "gh", "kn-", "-ng", "ph", "qu", "sh", voiced and voiceless "th", and "wh-") by introducing new letters and/or diacritics. Each letter would then represent a single sound. In a digraph, the two letters represent not their individual sounds but instead an entirely different and discrete sound, which can lengthen words and lead to mishaps in pronunciation.

Notable proposals include: 
 Benjamin Franklin's phonetic alphabet
 Deseret alphabet
 Interspel
 Shavian alphabet (revised version: Quikscript)
 SaypU (Spell As You Pronounce Universally)
 Simpel-Fonetik Method of Writing
 Unifon

Some speakers of non-Latin script languages occasionally write English phonetically in their respective writing systems, which may be perceived as an ad hoc spelling reform by some.

Historical and contemporary advocates of reform

A number of respected and influential people have been active supporters of spelling reform.

Orm/Orrmin, 12th century Augustine canon monk and eponymous author of the Ormulum, in which he stated that, since he dislikes that people are mispronouncing English, he will spell words exactly as they are pronounced, and describes a system whereby vowel length and value are indicated unambiguously. He distinguished short vowels from long by doubling the following consonants, or, where this is not feasible, by marking the short vowels with a superimposed breve accent.
 Thomas Smith, a Secretary of State to Queen Elizabeth I, who published his proposal De recta et emendata linguæ angliæ scriptione in 1568.
 William Bullokar was a schoolmaster who published his book English Grammar in 1586, an early book on that topic. He published his proposal Booke at large for the Amendment of English Orthographie in 1580.
 John Milton, poet.
 John Wilkins, founder member and first secretary of the Royal Society, early proponent of decimalisation and a brother-in-law to Oliver Cromwell.
Charles Butler, British naturalist and author of the first natural history of bees: Đe Feminin' Monarķi, 1634. He proposed that 'men should write altogeđer according to đe sound now generally received,' and espoused a system in which the h in digraphs was replaced with bars.
James Howell was a documented, successful (if modest) spelling reformer, recommending, in his Grammar of 1662, minor spelling changes, such as 'logique' to 'logic', 'warre' to 'war', 'sinne' to 'sin', 'toune' to 'town' and 'tru' to 'true', many of which are now in general use.
Benjamin Franklin, American innovator and revolutionary, added letters to the Roman alphabet for his own personal solution to the problem of English spelling.
Samuel Johnson, poet, wit, essayist, biographer, critic and eccentric, broadly credited with the standardisation of English spelling into its pre-current form in his Dictionary of the English Language (1755).
 Noah Webster, author of the first important American dictionary, believed that Americans should adopt simpler spellings where available and recommended it in his 1806 A Compendious Dictionary of the English Language.
 Charles Dickens
 Isaac Pitman developed the most widely used system of shorthand, known now as Pitman Shorthand, first proposed in Stenographic Soundhand (1837).
 U.S. President Theodore Roosevelt commissioned a committee, the Columbia Spelling Board, to research and recommend simpler spellings and tried to require the U.S. government to adopt them; however, his approach, to assume popular support by executive order, rather than to garner it, was a likely factor in the limited change of the time.
 Alfred Tennyson, 1st Baron Tennyson was a vice-president of the English Spelling Reform Association, precursor to the (Simplified) Spelling Society.
 Charles Darwin FRS, originator of the Theory of Evolution by Natural Selection, was also a vice-president of the English Spelling Reform Association, his involvement in the subject continued by his physicist grandson of the same name.
 John Lubbock, 1st Baron Avebury, close friend, neighbour and colleague of Charles Darwin, also involved in the Spelling Reform Association.
 H.G. Wells, science fiction writer and one-time Vice President of the London-based Simplified Spelling Society.
 Andrew Carnegie, celebrated philanthropist, donated to spelling reform societies on the US and Britain, and funded the Simplified Spelling Board.
 Daniel Jones, phonetician. professor of phonetics at University College London.
 George Bernard Shaw, playwright, willed part of his estate to fund the creation of a new alphabet now called the Shavian alphabet.
 Ronald Kingsley Read, creator of the Shavian alphabet, Quikscript and Readspel.
 Mark Twain, a founding member of the Simplified Spelling Board.
 Robert Baden-Powell, 1st Baron Baden-Powell
 Upton Sinclair
 Melvil Dewey, inventor of the Dewey Decimal System, wrote published works in simplified spellings and even simplified his own name from Melville to Melvil.
 Israel Gollancz
 James Pitman, a publisher and Conservative Member of Parliament, grandson of Isaac Pitman, invented the Initial Teaching Alphabet.
 Charles Galton Darwin, KBE, MC, FRS, grandson of Charles Darwin and director of Britain's National Physical Laboratory (NPL) in World War II, was also a wartime vice-president of the Simplified Spelling Society.
 Mont Follick, Labour Member of Parliament, linguist (multi-lingual) and author who preceded Pitman in drawing the English spelling reform issue to the attention of Parliament. Favoured replacing w and y with u and i.
 Isaac Asimov
 HRH Prince Philip, Duke of Edinburgh, one-time Patron of the Simplified Spelling Society. Stated that spelling reform should start outside of the UK, and that the lack of progress originates in the discord amongst reformers. However, his abandonment of the cause was coincident with literacy being no longer an issue for his own children, and his less than lukewarm involvement may have ended as a result of the Society's rejection of attempts to 'pull strings' behind the scenes.
Robert R. McCormick (1880–1955), publisher of the Chicago Tribune, employed reformed spelling in his newspaper. The Tribune used simplified versions of some words, such as "altho" for "although".
Edward Rondthaler (1905–2009), commercial actor, chairman of the American Literacy Council and vice-president of the Spelling Society.
John C. Wells, London-based phonetician, Esperanto teacher and former professor of phonetics at University College London: past President of The English Spelling Society.
Valerie Yule, a fellow of the Galton Institute, Vice-president of The English Spelling Society and founder of the Australian Centre for Social Innovations.
Doug Everingham, doctor, former Australian Labor politician, health minister in the Whitlam government, and author of Chemical Shorthand for Organic Formulae (1943), and a proponent of the proposed SR1, which he used in ministerial correspondence.
Allan Kiisk, professor of engineering, linguist (multi-lingual), author of Simple Phonetic English Spelling (2013) and Simpel-Fonetik Dictionary for International Version of Writing in English (2012).
 Anatoly Liberman, professor in the Department of German, Scandinavian and Dutch at the University of Minnesota advocates spelling reforms at his weekly column on word origins at the Oxford University Press blog. Current President of the English Spelling Society.

See also

 "The Chaos", a poem demonstrating the irregularity of English spelling
 Folk etymology
 Ghoti
 History of English grammars
 History of the English language
 List of reforms of the English language
 Orthographies and dyslexia
 Phonemic orthography
 The Phonetic Journal
 Phonological history of English

References

Further reading
 Bell, Masha (2004), Understanding English Spelling, Cambridge: Pegasus
 Bell, Masha (2012), SPELLING IT OUT: the problems and costs of English spelling, ebook
 Bell, Masha (2017), English Spelling Explained, Cambridge, Pegasus
 Children of the Code An extensive, in depth study of the illiteracy problem.
 Crystal, David. Spell It Out: The Curious, Enthralling and Extraordinary Story of English Spelling (St. Martin's Press, 2013)
 Condorelli, M. (2022). Pragmatic Framework. In Standardising English Spelling: The Role of Printing in Sixteenth and Seventeenth-century Graphemic Developments (Studies in English Language, pp. 40-58). Cambridge: Cambridge University Press.
 Hitchings, Henry. The language wars: a history of proper English (Macmillan, 2011)
 Kiisk, Allan (2013) Simple Phonetic English Spelling - Introduction to Simpel-Fonetik, the Single-Sound-per-Letter Writing Method, in printed, audio and e-book versions, Tate Publishing, Mustang, Oklahoma.
 Kiisk, Allan (2012) Simpel-Fonetik Dictionary - For International Version of Writing in English, Tate Publishing, Mustang, Oklahoma.
 Lynch, Jack. The Lexicographer's Dilemma: The Evolution of 'Proper' English, from Shakespeare to South Park (Bloomsbury Publishing USA, 2009)
 Marshall, David F. "The Reforming of English Spelling". Handbook of Language and Ethnic Identity: The Success-Failure Continuum in Language and Ethnic Identity Efforts (2011) 2:113+
 Wolman, David. Righting the Mother Tongue: From Olde English to Email, the Tangled Story of English Spelling. HarperCollins, 2009. .
 Zimmerman, Jonathan. "Simplified Spelling and the Cult of Efficiency in the 'Progressiv' Era." Journal of the Gilded Age & Progressive Era (2010) 9#3 pp. 365-394

External links
 "English accents and their implications for spelling reform", by J.C. Wells, University College London
 The OR-E system: Orthographic Reform of the English Language
 EnglishSpellingProblems blog by Masha Bell
 "Spelling reform: It didn't go so well in Germany" article in the Economist's Johnson Blog about spelling reform
 The Nooalf Revolution Provides an English-based international spelling system. The orthography has many similarities to Unifon.
 Wyrdplay.org has an extensive list of current spelling reform proposals.

 
History of the English language